Canterbury College may refer to:

 Canterbury College (Indiana), U.S.
 Canterbury College (Waterford), Queensland, Australia
 Canterbury College (Windsor, Ontario), Canada
 Canterbury College, Kent, England
 Canterbury College, Oxford, England
 Canterbury Girls' Secondary College, Victoria, Australia
 Canterbury University (Seychelles)
 University of Canterbury, New Zealand

See also
 Canterbury (disambiguation)